The Greenville micropolitan area may refer to:

The Greenville, Mississippi micropolitan area, United States
The Greenville, Ohio micropolitan area, United States

See also
Greenville metropolitan area (disambiguation)
Greenville (disambiguation)